William Marvin Matthews (born March 12, 1956) is a former American football linebacker in the National Football League (NFL) who played for the New England Patriots. He played college football at South Dakota State University.

References 

1956 births
Living people
Players of American football from Santa Monica, California
American football linebackers
South Dakota State Jackrabbits football players
New England Patriots players